Stephen Gould may refer to:
 Stephen Jay Gould (1941–2002), American paleontologist, evolutionary biologist and historian of science
 Stephen Gould (tenor), American opera singer

See also
 Steven Gould (born 1955), American science fiction author and teacher
Steve Gould (disambiguation)